The 2012 Singapore Super Series is the sixth super series tournament of the 2012 BWF Super Series. The tournament was held in Singapore from 19 to 24 June 2012 and had a total purse of $200,000.

Men's singles

Seeds

  Sho Sasaki (First round)
  Lee Hyun-il (Second round)
  Kenichi Tago (Second round)
  Simon Santoso (not participated)
  Du Pengyu (First round)
  Nguyen Tien Minh (Semifinal)
  Taufik Hidayat (First round)
  Shon Wan-ho (First round)

Top half

Bottom half

Finals

Women's singles

Seeds

  Jiang Yanjiao
  Juliane Schenk
  Sung Ji-hyun
  Cheng Shao-chieh
  Tai Tzu-ying
  Bae Youn-joo
  Sayaka Sato
  Gu Juan (First Round)

Top half

Bottom half

Finals

Men's doubles

Seeds

  Jung Jae-sung / Lee Yong-dae
  Ko Sung-hyun / Yoo Yeon-seong
  Muhammad Ahsan / Bona Septano
  Markis Kido / Hendra Setiawan
  Fang Chieh-min / Lee Sheng-mu
  Hong Wei / Shen Ye
  Naoki Kawamae / Shoji Sato
  Hirokatsu Hashimoto / Noriyasu Hirata

Top half

Bottom half

Finals

Women's doubles

Seeds

  Mizuki Fujii / Reika Kakiiwa
  Jung Kyung-eun / Kim Ha-na
  Shizuka Matsuo / Mami Naito
  Miyuki Maeda / Satoko Suetsuna
  Bao Yixin / Zhong Qianxin
  Cheng Wen-hsing / Chien Yu-chin
  Shinta Mulia Sari / Lei Yao
  Meiliana Jauhari / Greysia Polii

Top half

Bottom half

Finals

Mixed doubles

Seeds

  Tontowi Ahmad / Lilyana Natsir
  Chen Hung-ling / Cheng Wen-hsing
  Chan Peng Soon / Goh Liu Ying
  Shintaro Ikeda / Reiko Shiota
  He Hanbin / Bao Yixin
  Diju V. / Jwala Gutta
  Shoji Sato / Shizuka Matsuo
  Muhammad Rijal / Debby Susanto

Top half

Bottom half

Finals

References 

Singapore
Singapore Open (badminton)
Singapore Super Series